Sally Sarr (born 6 May 1986) is a French-born Mauritanian footballer who plays as a defender for Étoile Carouge in the Swiss Promotion League.

Club career
Sarr began his career in his native France with Le Havre AC before leaving to join Greek side Thrasyvoulos F.C.  in 2006. He spent three years with them but only manager 25 games during this time. In 2009, he moved to Switzerland to play for FC Wil in the Challenge League, helping the club to a respectable 3rd-placed finish. In 2009-10, he was part of the side that finished 6th in the Challenge League and in 2010-11, he impressed enough to earn a move to FC Luzern, stepping up to play in the Swiss Super League. Early into his Luzern career, he impressed enough to earn the nickname "Sally Sarr Superstar". He has previously been likened to Lilian Thuram.

International career
Sarr made his debut for the Mauritania football team in a 2017 Africa Cup of Nations qualification 1-1 tie with South Africa.

Dance
Sally is known for his unique belly flop dance, which he usually celebrates with.

References

External links

1986 births
Footballers from Le Havre
Living people
Mauritanian footballers
Mauritania international footballers
French footballers
French expatriate footballers
Swiss Super League players
Swiss Challenge League players
Swiss Promotion League players
Expatriate footballers in Switzerland
Expatriate footballers in Greece
Le Havre AC players
Thrasyvoulos F.C. players
FC Luzern players
FC Wil players
Servette FC players
Étoile Carouge FC players
Association football defenders
French sportspeople of Senegalese descent
French sportspeople of Mauritanian descent
French expatriate sportspeople in Switzerland
Mauritanian expatriate sportspeople in Switzerland
2019 Africa Cup of Nations players